Galyonki is a rural locality (a selo) in Oktyabrsky District of Primorsky Krai, Russia. Population:

History
It was founded in 1880.

Military
The 18th Guards Vitebsk Normandie-Niemen Attack Air Regiment of the 3rd Air and Air Defence Forces Command  (former 11th Air Army) was stationed at a military airfield in the vicinity, Galenki (air base), before its 2009 disbandment.

References

Rural localities in Primorsky Krai